Podengo Canario may refer to:
 Podenco Canario, a hunting dog from the Canary Islands
 Portuguese Podengo, a hunting dog from Portugal